is a Hiroden station on the Hiroden Main Line and Hiroden Hakushima Line, located in Hatchobori, Naka-ku, Hiroshima.

Routes
There are four routes that serve Hatchobori Station:
 Hiroshima Station – Hiroshima Port Route
 Hiroshima Station - Hiroden-miyajima-guchi Route
 Hiroshima Station - Eba Route
 Hakushima - Eba Route

Station layout
The station consists of three side platforms. The station is located on an intersection. One side platform is for the Hakushima Line, and is located to the north of the intersection. The Main Line platforms are staggered, and are located west and east of the intersection. Crosswalks connect the platforms with the sidewalk. The Main Line platforms have a shelter along the whole length of the platform, while the Hakushima Line platform has a small shelter located in the middle of the platform.

Platforms

Adjacent stations

Surrounding area
Fukuya Hatchobori
Tenmaya Hiroshima
Okonomi-mura

History
Opened on November 23, 1912.
Moved location on June 10, 1952.

See also

Hiroden Streetcar Lines and Routes

References

Hiroden Hakushima Line stations
Hiroden Main Line stations
Railway stations in Japan opened in 1912